2nd Idelbaevo (2-se İźelbay) is a rural locality (a village) in Taymeyevsky Selsoviet of Salavatsky District, Russia. The  population was 328 as of 2010.

Geography 
2nd Idelbaevo is located 45 km northwest of Maloyaz (the district's administrative centre) by road. 1st Idelbayevo is the nearest rural locality.

Ethnicity 
The village is inhabited by Bashkirs.

Streets 
 Zelenaya
 Molodezhnaya
 Naberezhnaya
 Tsentralnaya
 Shkolnaya

References

External links 
 2nd Idelbaevo on komandirovka.ru

Rural localities in Salavatsky District